Vince Aletti (born 1945) is a curator, writer, and photography critic.

Career

Music industry
Aletti was a contributing writer for Rolling Stone from 1970 to 1989. He was the first person to write about disco in an article published by the magazine in 1973. He also wrote a weekly column about disco for the music trade magazine Record World (1974–1979), and reported about early clubs like David Mancuso's The Loft for The Village Voice in the late 1970s and 1980s. Aletti was a senior editor at The Village Voice for nearly 20 years until leaving in early 2005.

Aletti worked with New York deejay Ritchie Rivera to curate a double-album disco compilation for Polydor Records, which released it in 1978 as Steppin' Out: Disco's Greatest Hits. Music critic Robert Christgau found it superior to Casablanca Records' Get Down and Boogie and Marlin's Disco Party, writing in Christgau's Record Guide: Rock Albums of the Seventies (1981): "Although local talent (Joe Simon, the Fatback Band) is represented, I find the spacey, lush-but-cool Euro-disco that predominates even more enticing, no doubt because the filler in which such music is usually swamped has been eliminated. New discoveries include the Chakachas' legendary 'Jungle Fever' and 'Running Away' by Roy Ayers, ordinarily the emptiest of 'jazz' pianists. This is disco the way it should be heard—as pure dance music, complete with risky changes."

In 1979 and 1980, Aletti also worked as the A&R Rep for Ray Caviano’s RFC Records.

Photography
Aletti is best known for his contributions to fine art photography. He reviewed photography exhibitions for The New Yorker until 2016.

Aletti has also curated numerous photography exhibitions, and has contributed writing for dozens of photography books. In 1998, Aletti was the curator of a highly praised exhibition of art and photography called Male, which was followed up in 1999 by Female, both at Wessel + O'Connor Gallery in New York. In conjunction with those shows, he was the co-editor the book "Male/Female: 105 photographs"  published by Aperture in 1999, featuring his interview with Madonna, which was later anthologized in Da Capo's Best Music Writing (2000).

In 2000, he was the co-curator of an exhibition called Settings & Players: Theatrical Ambiguity in American Photography at London's White Cube. The following year Aletti organized Steven Klein American Beauty a retrospective exhibition  of Steven Klein's fashion work for the Musée de l'Élysée in Lausanne, Switzerland.

Aletti was one of the two featured writers of The Book of 101 Books: Seminal Photographic Books of the Twentieth Century (2001).

In 2005, Aletti was the recipient of the Infinity Award for writing by The International Center for Photography.

Exhibitions curated by Aletti
1998: Male. Wessel + O'Connor Gallery, New York.
1999: Male/Female. Wessel + O'Connor Gallery, New York.
2000: Settings & Players: Theatrical Ambiguity in American Photography. White Cube, London.
2001: Steven Klein American Beauty. Musée de l’Élysée, Lausanne, Switzerland.
2008: Male: work from the collection of Vince Aletti. White Columns, New York.
2010: Dress Codes The Third ICP Triennial of Photography and Video. International Centre of Photography, New York. Curated with Kristen Lubben, Christopher Phillips, and Carol Squiers.

Bibliography

1990–1999
 
 
2000–2009
 Settings and Players: Theatrical Ambiguity in American Photography. London: White Cube, 2001. 
 Four Days in LA: The Versace Collection. London: White Cube, 2001. 
 The Book of 101 Books: Seminal Photographic Books of the Twentieth Century. New York: PPP Editions, 2001. 
 Snapshots: The Eye Of the Century. Berlin: Hatje Cantz Publishers, 2004. 
 David Hilliard. New York: Aperture, 2005. 
 Ingar Krauss: Portraits. Berlin: Hatje Cantz Publishers, 2006. 
 Mark Cohen:True Color. New York: powerHouse Books, 2007. 
 Face of Fashion. New York: Aperture, 2007. 
 Hedi Slimane: Rock Diary. Zurich: JRP|Ringier, 2008. 
 Bruce of Los Angeles: Inside/Outside. New York: Antinous Press, 2008. 
 Look at me: Photographs from Mexico City by Jed Fielding. Chicago: University Of Chicago Press, 2009. 
 Avedon Fashion 1944-2000. New York: Harry N. Abrams, 2009. 
 The Disco Files 1973-78: New York's Underground Week by Week. New York: DJhistory.com, 2009. 
2010–2019
 Male: From the Collection of Vince Aletti. New York: PPP Editions, 2010. 
  Reviews the 'Pictures by Women: A History of Modern Photography' exhibition at the Museum of Modern Art (MoMA).
 Michael Thompson: Portraits. Bologna: Damiani, 2011. 
  Discusses Mark Morrisroe.
  Reviews the 'Radical Camera' exhibition at the Jewish Museum.
 Saul Leiter. Heidelberg: Kehrer Verlag, 2012. 
 New York at Night: Photography After Dark. New York: powerHouse Books, 2012. 
  Vivian Maier.
  Reviews 'Faking It: Manipulated Photography Before Photoshop' at the Metropolitan Museum of Art.
  Retrospectives of Roman Vishniac and David Seymour at the International Center of Photography.
  Retrospective of Bill Brandt at the Museum of Modern Art (MoMA).
  Photography and the American Civil War at the Met.
  A Different Kind of Order at the International Center of Photography.
  War/Photography : Images of Armed Conflict and Its Aftermath.
 A Respect for Light: The Latin American Photographs: 1974-2008. New York: Glitterati, 2014. 
 Peter Hujar: Love & Lust. San Francisco: Fraenkel Gallery, 2014. 
 Mark Cohen: Dark Knees. Paris: Lebal, 2014. 
 Stephen Irwin. Berlin: r/e projects, 2015.  
 David Wojnarowicz: Brush Fires in the Social Landscape: Twentieth Anniversary Edition. New York: Aperture, 2015. 
  Reviews the 'Sarah Charlesworth: Doubleworld' exhibition at the New Museum.
 Peter Hujar: Lost Downtown. New York: Pace MacGill Gallery, 2016. 
 Issues: A History of Photography in Fashion Magazines''. London/New York: Phaidon Press, 2019.

References

External links
 Video: An Evening with Nan Goldin and Vince Aletti: Remembering Peter Hujar
Video: Vince Aletti: Face of Fashion: Fashion Photography, Art Direction, and Magazine Design
 Video: Saul Leiter in Conversation with Vince Aletti
 Video: Vince Aletti on Peter Hujar’s Love & Lust
 Video: Talk with Mark Cohen and Vince Aletti at LE BAL, Paris
 Video: Joe Szabo & Vince Aletti | Rolling Stones Fans

1945 births
Living people
American music journalists
The New Yorker critics
Photography critics
Writers from New York (state)
The Village Voice people